Jeremy Dennis Morley (born 20 October 1950 in Newmarket, Suffolk) is an English former cricketer active from 1969 to 1976 who played for Sussex. He appeared in 72 first-class matches as a lefthanded batsman who bowled right arm medium pace and sometimes kept wicket. He scored 2,752 runs with a highest score of 127 and took no wickets. He completed 27 matches with one stumping.

Notes

1950 births
English cricketers
Sussex cricketers
Cambridgeshire cricketers
Living people